Oxalis brasiliensis, also known by its common name Brazilian woodsorrel is a species from the section Ionoxalis. It was first described by Dámaso Antonio Larrañaga.

Description
Oxalis brasiliensis is a herbaceous, perennial plant with a very long but simple root and very small stems. It has yellow or brilliant crimson-purple flowers.

Gallery

References

brasiliensis
Taxa named by Dámaso Antonio Larrañaga